is a Japanese female fashion model and tarento who is represented with Starray Production.

Her husband is actor Riki Miura.

Biography
Yamamoto was born in Nagoya. Her father is chairman of the field manager of Pachinko machine wholesale company Fields, racehorse Casino Drive. Hidetoshi Yamamoto, who is also an owner of Pelusa and others. One of her older brothers is actor Takeshi Yamamoto who is eleven years older than her. She also has another older brother.

After graduating from junior high school, she moved to Tokyo. When she was a high school student she was scouted to the editorial staff of the fashion magazine Ranzuki in front of Shibuya 109 and began making her magazine debut as a model. Her skin colour at that time was darker, in which she was a so-called ganguro gyaru.

After that, when the magazine Jelly launched she currently became an exclusive model since its launch, and made full use of modelling activities. The magazine is often responsible for styles such as "strengthening" and "sexy" mainly. In its separate volume of the magazine Celeb Jelly, she was in charge of the style of "Paris Hilton".

Currently her activities are diverse and have appeared on television programmes, etc.

Private life
Her hobbies are watching K-1 and making sweets. Ballet dancing is her special skill. She participated in the launch party of K-1 where her father's company sponsors a special spot and published numerous pictures with K-1 fighters on her own blog.

On 3 September 2010, she announced her marriage with actor Riki Miura on her blog and she gave birth to the first child on 28 January 2011. On 9 July 2012 she later gave birth to her second child.

Filmography

Magazines

Television

Advertisements

Music videos

DVD
 Guest participation works

Events

Stage

References

External links 

 
 

Japanese female models
People from Nagoya
1987 births
Living people